Emirler is a village in the Cide District of Kastamonu Province in Turkey. Its population is 114 (2021).

References

Villages in Cide District